The Government of West Bengal. also known as the West Bengal Government, is the subnational government of the Indian state of West Bengal , created by the National Constitution as the state's legislative, executive and judicial authority. The State Governor acts as the head of state and is the highest nominal authority of the state power, however, it is the Chief Minister who is the chief executive authority and head of government. 

The Chief Minister is the head of government and is vested with most of the executive powers. Kolkata, the capital of West Bengal, houses the West Bengal Legislative Assembly. The temporary secretariat is located in the Nabanna building in the district of Howrah, adjacent to the state capital. The Calcutta High Court is located in Kolkata, which has jurisdiction over the whole of West Bengal and the Union Territory of Andaman and Nicobar Islands.

The present Legislative Assembly of West Bengal is unicameral, consisting of 294 Member of the Legislative Assembly (MLA) including one nominated from the Anglo-Indian community. Its term is 5 years, unless sooner dissolved.

The current chief minister is Mamata Banerjee, who assumed the office on 20 May 2011. She is the founder and leader of the All India Trinamool Congress party, which won 184 seats (out of 294) in the 2011 West Bengal Legislative Assembly election, 211 seats (out of 294) in the 2016 West Bengal Legislative Assembly election and 215 seats (out of 294) in the 2021 West Bengal Legislative Assembly election.

Head Leaders

History 
On 18 January 1862, under the Indian Councils Act of 1861, a 12-member Legislative Council for Bengal was founded by the Governor-General of India with the Lt Governor of Bengal and some nominated members. The strength of this council was gradually increased by subsequent acts. Under the Indian Councils Act of 1892, the maximum strength of the council was increased to 20 members out of which seven members were to be elected. After the Indian Councils Act of 1909, the number raised to 50 members.

Organization 

 The West Bengal government is divided into different ministries.

Departments

Department and Secretaries

Council of Ministers 

 The West Bengal government headed by Mamata Banerjee has 40 ministers. Among them, 10 are Ministers of State holding independent charge, 9 are junior ministers and 20 are senior ministers.

References

Citations

Sources

External links 

 

 
1862 establishments in India
Producers who won the Best Feature Film National Film Award
Producers who won the Best Popular Film Providing Wholesome Entertainment National Film Award
Producers who won the Best Children's Film National Film Award